Al-ʻIjliyyah bint al-ʻIjliyy was a 10th-century maker of astrolabes active in Aleppo, in what is now northern Syria.

She is sometimes known in modern popular literature as Mariam al-Asṭurlābiyya but her supposed first name 'Mariam' is not mentioned in the only known source about her life.

Life 

According to ibn al-Nadim, she was the daughter of another astrolabe maker known as al-ʻIjliyy; she and her father were apprentices (tilmīthah) of an astrolabe maker from Baghdad, Nasṭūlus.

Al-ʻIjliyyah manufactured astrolabes, an astronomical instrument, during the 10th century; she was employed by the first Emir of Aleppo, Sayf al-Dawla, who reigned from 944 to 967.

Beyond that information, nothing is known about her. Her supposed name, "Mariam", is not supported by sources from her time, and the phrase "al-Asturlabiyy" in the names by which she and her father are known simply means "the astrolabist", and indicates their profession; astrolabes were long known by her time.

Legacy 

The main-belt asteroid 7060 Al-ʻIjliya, discovered by Henry E. Holt at Palomar Observatory in 1990, was named in her honor. The naming citation was published on 14 November 2016.

She inspired a character in the 2015 award-winning book Binti. She was named an extraordinary woman from the Islamic Golden Age by 1001 Inventions.

See also 
 Astronomy in the medieval Islamic world
 List of Muslim astronomers
 List of women astronomers
 Timeline of women in science

References

External links 

 Astrolabe: the 13th Century iPhone – Daily Sabah
 GPS and its Islamic origins,  The Star Online, 3 October 2013

10th-century astronomers
Scientific instrument makers
Women astronomers
Astronomers of the medieval Islamic world
Medieval women scientists
Syrian women scientists
10th-century women
Medieval Syrian astronomers
Women scholars of the medieval Islamic world